Ann or Anne Barry may refer to:

Ann Street Barry (1733–1801), English stage actress
Anne Barry, character in 6,000 Enemies